Khorasan may refer to:

 Greater Khorasan, a historical region which lies mostly in modern-day northern/northwestern Afghanistan, northeastern Iran, southern Turkmenistan, Tajikistan, and Uzbekistan
 Khorasan Province, a pre-2004 province of Iran, subsequently divided into:
South Khorasan Province
North Khorasan Province
Razavi Khorasan Province
 Khorasan, Kurdistan, a village in Kurdistan Province, Iran
 Khorosan, an alternate name of Sain Qaleh, Iran
 Khuroson District, a district in Khatlon province of Tajikistan
 Horasan, a town and district of Erzurum Province of Turkey
 Khorasan wheat, a wheat variety
 Khorasan group, a group of senior al-Qaeda members who reportedly operate in Syria
 Islamic State of Iraq and the Levant – Khorasan Province, a branch of ISIL that operates in Pakistan and Afghanistan

See also
 Khorasani (disambiguation)
 Khwarazm or Chorasmia, an oasis region south of the Aral Sea
 Khwarazmian (disambiguation)